Neetzan Zimmerman (born 1981) is a blogger known for focusing on "viral" internet content.  He worked for Gawker from April 2012 through January 2014, and then later served as editor-in-chief at start-up company "Whisper". He was senior director of audience and strategy at the DC publication The Hill from 2015 to 2018, and is currently employed by Lightspeed Venture partners.

Biography
Neetzan Zimmerman was born on a kibbutz in Israel. He graduated from University of Massachusetts Boston in 2007 with a bachelor's degree in communications.

Blogger career
Zimmerman was hired by Gawker in April 2012.  He specializes in finding high-traffic content.  According to a December 2013 profile in The Wall Street Journal, Zimmerman's Gawker posts are generating in excess of 30 million hits per month, essentially subsidizing the ability of Gawker journalists to pursue more in-depth content.

Previously, Zimmerman ran "The Daily What", which he founded in 2008 as a website for aggregating viral content.  He ran that site on a mostly one-person basis for about three years, while still working for publishing firm Wiley-Blackwell, and eventually becoming his full-time job.  The site was bought by the I Can Has Cheezburger? network in 2010.

On January 14, 2015, it was announced that Zimmerman would be leaving Whisper after a series of accusations involving the company's editorial practices.

Those accusations were later retracted and a lengthy correction was issued by The Guardian.

References

Gawker Media
Living people
Online journalists
1981 births